Otto Titzling is a fictional character who is apocryphally described as the inventor of the brassière in the 1971 book Bust-Up: The Uplifting Tale of Otto Titzling, published by Macdonald in London and by Prentice-Hall in the USA.

The name, a pun on "a two-tit sling", was invented by New Zealand humorist Wallace Reyburn in the 1970s. Since then, the name has appeared in the game Trivial Pursuit (believing the hoax, the game's makers listed "Otto Titzling" as the "correct answer" to the question of who invented the brassière), on the TV show Hollywood Squares in the late 1980s (John Davidson's first two mispronunciations of the name had to be bleeped for broadcast), in the 1984 pornographic film Intimate Couples (in which Joanna [Jacqueline Lorians] reads the Trivial Pursuit card shortly before the climactic orgy scene), in the 1988 movie Beaches (featuring the song "Otto Titsling" sung by Bette Midler), and in the comic strip Luann by Greg Evans, and has appeared in practice questions sent out to prospective teams by the BBC 2 show University Challenge.

Peter Cook references Otto Titzling as the inventor of the brassiere during a Pete and Dud skit with Dudley Moore, in their West End stage show Beyond the Fringe, first broadcast on BBC2 in 1974.

A similar situation exists with Thomas Crapper, who was a real plumber but did not invent the flushing lavatory. Reyburn popularised this myth in "Flushed With Pride: The Story of Thomas Crapper".

Footnotes

External links
False claim: The brassiere was invented by Otto Titzling (from Snopes.com)

Urban legends
Fictional inventors